The List of shipwrecks in 1770 includes some of the ships sunk, wrecked, or otherwise lost during 1770.

January

5 January

11 January

12 January

13 January

16 January

27 January

Unknown date

February

7 February

8 February

15 February

18 February

28 February

Unknown date

March

9 March

11 March

13 March

17 March

31 March

Unknown date

April

2 April

6 April

15 April

20 April

21 April

Unknown date

May

5 May

13 May

31 May

June

2 June

3 June

7 June

11 June

Unknown date

July

2 July

23 July

Unknown date

August

Unknown date

September

7 September

15 September

Unknown date

October

17 October

28 October

Unknown date

November

5 November

10 November

December

12 December

19 December

27 December

Unknown date

Unknown date

References

1770